The unusually titled album name Halal & Loving It which was released in Malaysia, Brunei, Singapore as well as the rest of Asia in the beginning of 2008 and contains a number of One Buck Short's biggest and most memorable hits such as "That Day" and the singles, "Fast Times", "10:04" and "Kelibat Korupsi".

'Halal & Loving It'' as an album title was casually suggested by Avtar Singh, a Sabahan & cousin to lead guitarist Rahul and adopted by the band.

Track listing
  "Takeoffs & Landings" – 3:16
  "Kelibat Korupsi" – 2:45 
  "Fast Times" – 3:02 
  "Explicit Crimes (Taking the Lead)" – 2:43
  "10:04" – 3:30
  "Khayalan Masa" – 3:07
  "R.I.P." – 3:10
  "Runaway Topguns" – 2:41
  "Ush Ka Dush" – 2:56
  "K.I.S.S." – 3:57
  "That Day" – 3:56
  "Kerana Tiada Plihan Lain" – 2:16

2006 albums
One Buck Short albums